Karen Seel is the District 5 Commissioner in Pinellas County, Florida.

Seel was appointed to the board in 1999 by Governor Jeb Bush to fill an unexpired term. She was first elected in 2000 to a four-year term and again in 2004. Seel attended the University of Florida for her bachelor's degree. In addition she earned her Master of Business Administration from American University.

References

External links 
Board of Commissioners

University of Florida alumni
Living people
Year of birth missing (living people)